Woeste is a surname. Notable people with the surname include:

Charles Woeste (1837–1922), Belgian politician
 (1807–1878), German teacher
Peter Woeste, German-Canadian television director, cinematographer, and camera operator